Maharashtra Gramin Bank is an Indian Regional Rural Bank (RRB) or Gramin bank, in the State of Maharashtra with its head office is in Aurangabad.  It is one of the 43 Gramin banks in India supported by the government that aim to bring banking services to rural areas. It is under the ownership of Ministry of Finance , Government of India.

 the bank had 413 fully computerised CBS branches. Its branch network is concentrated in seven regions of Maharashtra, namely, Aurangabad, Beed, Latur, Nanded, Hingoli, Parbhani, Thane and Nashik.

History
Govt of India vide its notification dated 25 March 2008 amalgamated the two RRBs i.e. Aurangabad Jalna Gramin Bank & Thane Gramin Bank into a single RRB named Maharashtra Godavari Gramin Bank. 

As per notification issued by Government of India, Ministry of Finance, Department of Financial Services ref no F.No 1/4/2006-RRB(II) dated 20 July 2009, Maharashtra Gramin Bank came into existence on 20 July 2009 after amalgamation of erstwhile Maharashtra Godavari Gramin Bank and Marathawada Gramin Bank. As per Government of India, Ministry of Finance order No. F1/4/2012-RRB, dated 17 July 2014.

The bank was sponsored by Bank of Maharashtra. The share capital of the bank was contributed by Government of India and during the administrative setup of the bank, one CGM and two general managers report to the chairman.

Board of directors
Milind Gharad ,Chairman
 

 Shri M.K.Moon AGM, Financial inclusion RBI Mumbai
  AGM, Rural Planning & Credit Department, Reserve Bank of India, Regional Office, Mumbai
 Dr. Ushamani P DGM, National Bank for Agriculture & Rural Development, Maharashtra Regional Office, Pune
 Shri A.M.More AGM, Agriculture & Rural Development, Bank Of Maharastra,Head office Pune
 Shri A.B.Thorat Zonal Manager, Bank of Maharashtra Aurangabad Zone
 Shri Shivanand Taksale I.A.S, Additional Commissioner, Aurangabad
 Additional Commissioner, Nasik

See also

 Banking in India
 List of banks in India
 Reserve Bank of India
 Regional Rural Bank
 Indian Financial System Code
 List of largest banks
 List of companies of India
 Make in India

References

Regional rural banks of India
Banks based in Maharashtra
2008 establishments in Maharashtra
Indian companies established in 2008
Banks established in 2008